Milla Davenport (February 4, 1871 – May 17, 1936) was a stage and film actress, born in Zurich, Switzerland. Davenport was educated in Switzerland] and appeared with her husband, actor Harry J. Davenport's (not the more famous Harry Davenport) repertory company for fifteen years. Davenport began her career in motion pictures in the silent film Trapping the Bachelor (1916). She was in Daddy-Long-Legs (1919) with Mary Pickford, The Brat (1919) with Nazimova, Sins of the Fathers (1928) with Emil Jannings, and The Wedding Night (1935). Davenport continued to make movies well into the sound film era. Her last film credits are for roles in The Defense Rests (1934), Here Comes Cookie (1935), and an uncredited part in Human Cargo (1936).

Davenport died in Los Angeles, California in 1936, aged 65. She was buried in the Hollywood Forever Cemetery.

Partial filmography

 Social Briars (1918)
 Daddy-Long-Legs (1919)
 The Brat (1919)
 In Mizzoura (1919)
 Stronger Than Death (1920)
 The Forbidden Woman (1920)
 You Never Can Tell (1920)
 She Couldn't Help It (1920)
 Rip Van Winkle (1921)
 The Man from Lost River (1921)
 Patsy (1921)
 Why Trust Your Husband? (1921)
 The Worldly Madonna (1922)
 Dulcy (1923)
 Daddies (1924)
 The Right of the Strongest (1924)
 The Red Lily (1924)
 Dangerous Innocence (1925)
 Wild West (1925)
 The Road to Glory (1926)
 Crazy like a Fox (1926)
 Crossed Signals (1926)
 Hey! Hey! Cowboy (1927)
 The Danger Rider (1928)
 Sins of the Fathers (1928)
 The Girl from Woolworth's (1929)
 The Wedding Night (1935)
 Here Comes Cookie (1935)

References

External links

 
 

1871 births
1936 deaths
Burials at Hollywood Forever Cemetery
American silent film actresses
Swiss emigrants to the United States
19th-century American actresses
American stage actresses
20th-century American actresses
American expatriates in Switzerland